Pressed glass (or pattern glass) is a form of glass made by pressing molten glass into a mold using a plunger. It was first patented by American inventor John P. Bakewell in 1825 to make knobs for furniture.

The technique was developed in the United States from the 1820s and in Europe, particularly France, Bohemia, and Sweden from the 1830s.  By the mid-19th century, most inexpensive mass-produced glassware was pressed (1850–1910).   One type of pressed glass is carnival glass. Painted pressed glass produced in the early 20th century is often called goofus glass.  The method is also used to make beads.

See also
 Millefiori

References 

Glass production
Glass art
1825 introductions